Stepup Col is a snow-covered north-south running col linking Broad Valley and Cugnot Ice Piedmont, between the east end of Louis Philippe Plateau and Kumata Hill, Trinity Peninsula. The name given by United Kingdom Antarctic Place-Names Committee (UK-APC) is descriptive, as 100 ft in height is gained when the col is traversed in a northerly direction.

Map
 Trinity Peninsula. Scale 1:250000 topographic map No. 5697. Institut für Angewandte Geodäsie and British Antarctic Survey, 1996.

Mountain passes of Trinity Peninsula